Guillaume de Pierre Godin (Guilhem de Peyre Godin) (c. 1260 – 1336) was a French Dominican theologian, and Cardinal.

Life
Godin was born in Bayonne and spent his early years in south-west France. In 1292 he was briefly in Paris, where he was an early opponent of Duns Scotus.  From 1306 he was master of the Sacred Palace. His work there as lecturer was important in creating the Dominican orthodox Thomist position.

On either December 23 or 24, 1312, Godin was named a cardinal by Pope Clement V.  He was Cardinal Priest of Santa Cecilia in Trastevere until sometime after September 12, 1317, when he was transferred to be Cardinal Bishop of Sabina.

From 1320 to 1324 Godin was papal legate in Spain.  He was named Dean of the Sacred College of Cardinals in November 1323  From 1326 he was engaged in demon-hunting episcopal trials in the area of Cahors and Toulouse.

Godin contributed financially to the construction of the nave of the Church of the Jacobins in Toulouse.

He is represented in a fresco at the Couvent des Jacobins at Saint-Sever. His coat-of-arms figures in the vaults of the church of Saint Dominique at Toulouse. Until the 19th century his coat-of-arms also appeared in the vaults of Bayonne Cathedral.

Works
He is now considered the author of the polemical work De causa immediata ecclesiasticæ potestatis, which in the past has been attributed to Peter Paludanus, now dated to around 1318.

References
Tractatus de causa immediata ecclesiastice potestatis: The Theory of Papal Monarchy in the Fourteenth Century by Guillaume de Pierre Godin (1981), editor William D. McCready
Wouter Goris, Martin Pickavé: Die 'Lectura Thomasina' des Guilelmus Petri de Godino (ca. 1260–1336), in: J. Hamesse (Ed.): Roma, magistra mundi. Itineraria culturae medievalis. Mélanges offerts au Père L. E. Boyle à l'occasion de son 75e anniversaire III (Textes et études du moyen âge 10/3). Louvain–la–Neuve 1998, 83–109.

Notes

1336 deaths
Scholastic philosophers
French Dominicans
14th-century French cardinals
Cardinal-bishops of Sabina
Deans of the College of Cardinals
13th-century births
Dominican cardinals